Piotr Misztal (born 10 July 1987) is a Polish professional footballer who plays as a goalkeeper for Znicz Pruszków.

References

External links
 

1987 births
Footballers from Warsaw
Living people
Polish footballers
Association football goalkeepers
Korona Kielce players
Znicz Pruszków players
GKS Tychy players
Ekstraklasa players
I liga players
II liga players